Grobert is a surname. Notable people with the surname include:

 Helen Grobert (born 1992), German cross-country cyclist
 Nicole Grobert, British-German materials chemist

See also
 Gobert
 Robert